Jorge Sanjinez Lenz (January 24, 1917 – August 24, 2020) was a Peruvian military veteran of Belgian descent who participated as a military volunteer in World War II, on the side of the Allies for the liberation of Europe from the Axis Powers. He enlisted in the Piron Brigade in the Free Belgian forces.

Early years 
He was born on January 24, 1917, in Moquegua, Peru. His childhood passed through periods in his country and in Bolivia.

Second World War 
In December 1942, in the midst of the Second World War. Sanjinez attended the Belgian embassy in Lima to enroll in the rebel camp that the government of the European country was promoting, along with other governments in exile, to end the Nazi occupation. The Peruvian Armed Forces recognized the decision and provided special training to Sanjinez, the government of Peru was part of the allies.

He left on a Chilean ship bound for New York and from there to London. During his stay in the British capital, he got lost with a friend in Hyde Park, London where they survived The Blitz.

His first participation was in August 1944, in the Battle of Normandy, then in the Dutch campaigns. Sanjinez said that during his stay on the Western Front he knew death directly:

The other campaigns of Sanjinez were the advances for the German unemployment in 1944 of France (Cabourg, August 21, Deauville, August 22 and Honfleur, August 24) and Belgium (Brussels, September 3).

Post-war 

In 1946 he returned to Peru after finishing his volunteering in 1945, he married his third wife Meldín Alava, a native of Pucallpa and had two children. He also had three other children from his previous relationships. He also worked for the airline company Faucett, from the 1940s and 1950s.

Death 
Sanjinez died on 24 August 2020 at his home in Pucallpa at 103 years of age due to lung cancer, an ailment that had afflicted him for some time. He was the last Latin American soldier to die who participated in D Day.

Awards 
He received several recognitions and medals for his participation. The most important is the medal of the Legion of Honor in knighthood by France, awarded in 2017 by the French embassy.

References 

1917 births
2020 deaths
People from Moquegua
Peruvian military personnel
Belgian military personnel of World War II
Peruvian centenarians
Men centenarians
Recipients of the Legion of Honour
Deaths from cancer in Peru
Deaths from lung cancer
Peruvian people of Belgian descent